Henry Osborne may refer to:
Henry Osborne (American politician) (1751–1800), public official from Pennsylvania and Georgia
Henry Osborne (admiral) (1694–1771), British naval officer who served as Commodore Governor of Newfoundland
Sir Henry Osborne, 11th Baronet (1759–1837), Irish baronet and politician
Henry Osborne (Australian politician) (1803–1859), Australian pastoralist, collier and politician
Henry Osborne Havemeyer (1847–1907), American entrepreneur
Henry Z. Osborne (1848–1923), American Republican politician

See also
Henry Osborn (disambiguation)
Harry Osborne (disambiguation)